Olos (2000) is an album by the Finnish rock group Absoluuttinen Nollapiste.

Track listing
 "Valajas helkures" (Aake Otsala, Aki Lääkkölä) – 3:02
 "Kalkin sammutus" (Otsala, Tommi Liimatta) – 4:10
 "Kotiinpaluu, jotenkin" (Otsala, Liimatta, Lääkkölä) – 3:02
 "Tavan sinä pyhität" (Liimatta, Otsala, Tomi Krutsin) – 3:41
 "Ja jos" (Liimatta) – 3:54
 "Tie tomun suuntima" (Liimatta, Lääkkölä) – 4:06
 "Neljä ruukkua neliössä" (Liimatta, Lääkkölä) – 3:47
 "Synkkää lunastusta, baby" (Liimatta, Lääkkölä) – 3:33
 "Käsitys mummoloista" (Otsala, Liimatta, Lääkkölä) – 5:15
 "Soita kotiin, Elvis" (Liimatta) – 3:33
 "Harhailua maastossa" (Liimatta, Lääkkölä) – 4:44
 "Tonttirajat sovitaan humalassa" (Liimatta, Lääkkölä, Otsala) – 3:43

Personnel

 Tommi Liimatta - Vocals, Pieksämäki Guitar
 Aki Lääkkölä - Guitar, Keyboards
 Aake Otsala - Bass Guitar
 Tomi Krutsin - Drums
 Teemu Eskelinen - Vocals
 Otto Hallamaa - Öylätti Guitar, Producer, Engineer, Mixing
 Absoluuttinen Nollapiste - Producers
 Juuso Nordlund - Engineer, Mixing
 Pauli Saastamoinen - Mastering
 Tuula Alajoki - Photography
 Jooga Jykylä - Photography
 Japa Mattila - Layout

External links
  Album entry at band's official website

Absoluuttinen Nollapiste albums
2000 albums